Albania established diplomatic relations with China on November 23, 1949. As a United Nations member state, in 1963, Albania proposed and supported diplomatically the readmission of China to this organization.  On October 25, 1971, at the 26th session of the General Assembly, the People's Republic of China was fully admitted to the UN.

List of diplomatic representatives of Albania to China (1954–present)

References 

 
China
Albania